Daniel Šlachta (13 February 1923 – 16 April 2007) was a Slovak alpine skier. He competed in three events at the 1948 Winter Olympics.

References

1923 births
2007 deaths
Slovak male alpine skiers
Olympic alpine skiers of Czechoslovakia
Alpine skiers at the 1948 Winter Olympics
Sportspeople from Žilina